Aloa flavimargo is a moth of the family Erebidae. It was described by George Hampson in 1894. It is found in Myanmar.

References

Moths described in 1894
Erebid moths of Asia